Kepner is a surname. Notable people with the surname include:

Jeff Kepner, American hand transplant recipient
Jim Kepner (1923–1997), American journalist, author, historian, archivist and leader in the gay rights movement
William Ellsworth Kepner (1893–1982), American officer in the United States Army, United States Army Air Corps and United States Air Force, balloonist, and airship pilot